Hemicythara is a genus of sea snails, marine gastropod mollusks in the family Mangeliidae.

Species
According to the World Register of Marine Species (WoRMS) the following species with valid names are included within the genus Hemicythara :
 Hemicythara angicostata (Reeve, 1846)
 Hemicythara octangulata (Dunker, 1860)
Species brought into synonymy
 Hemicythara melanostoma A. Garrett, 1873: synonym of Hemicythara angicostata  (L.A. Reeve, 1846)
 Hemicythara scalata S.M. Souverbie, 1874: synonym of Hemicythara angicostata  (L.A. Reeve, 1846)

References

 Kuroda, T.; Habe, T.; Oyama, K. (1971). The Sea Shells of Sagami Bay. Maruzen Co., Tokyo. xix, 1-741 (Japanese text), 1-489 (English text), 1-51 (Index), pls 1-121

External links
  Bouchet P., Kantor Yu.I., Sysoev A. & Puillandre N. (2011) A new operational classification of the Conoidea. Journal of Molluscan Studies 77: 273-308.
 Worldwide Mollusc Species Data Base: Mangeliidae
  Tucker, J.K. 2004 Catalog of recent and fossil turrids (Mollusca: Gastropoda). Zootaxa 682:1-1295.

 
Gastropod genera